Shelden is a surname. Notable people with the surname include:

Carlos D. Shelden (1840-1904), American soldier and politician
Copeland Shelden (1907-1977), American orthodontist 
Michael Shelden (born 1951), American biographer and teacher
Ransom B. Shelden Sr. (1814-1878), American city founder